Game is the debut studio album by KHM, an American rap group consisting of Kool Keith, H-Bomb (aka Jacky Jasper) and Marc Live. It was released on November 19, 2002 via Number 6 Records and was entirely produced by all the three members of the group. English trip hop artist Tricky made guest appearance on the track "Run Dem Red". The album peaked at number 42 on the Top R&B/Hip-Hop Albums, number 33 on the Independent Albums, number 26 on the Heatseekers Albums.

The trio later changed the name to Clayborne Family and released their second album titled Clayborne Family on October 20, 2004 via Threshold Recordings.

Track listing

Personnel
Keith Matthew Thornton  –  vocals, keyboards, producer, executive producer
Marc Giveand  –  vocals, mixing, programming, producer, executive producer
Sean Merrick  –  vocals, keyboards, mixing, producer, executive producer
Davida "The Diva" Sullivan  –  singing vocals
Adrian Nicholas Matthews Thaws –  featured artist (track 6)
Darrick Angelone  –  executive producer
Gene Grimaldi  –  mastering

References

External links

2002 debut albums
Kool Keith albums